Rune Holta (born 29 August 1973 in Stavanger, Norway) is a speedway rider. He grew up in Randaberg Norway, but has been a Polish citizen since 2002, allowing him to represent Poland in international competitions and was a member of their Speedway World Cup winning teams in 2005, 2007 & 2010.  He has also won the Polish Championship in 2003 and 2007.

In 2020, he rode for Dackarna Malilla in the Swedish Elit League and for Włókniarz Częstochowa in the Polish Ekstraliga. In 2022, he helped PSŻ Poznań win the 2022 2.Liga.

Awards
For his sport achievements, he received: 
 Golden Cross of Merit in 2007.

Speedway Grand Prix

Plane crash 

In 2007 Holta survived a plane crash with fellow rider Tomasz Gollob. The plane, flown by Władysław Gollob, crashed on the way to a meeting at Tarnów. Holta escaped with cuts and bruises.

On his official website, Holta stated "In spite of the circumstance I'm doing OK but I'm very shaken. We have been very lucky, and I'm just glad that I'm still alive."

See also 

 List of Speedway Grand Prix riders
 Norway national speedway team
 Poland national speedway team

References 

1973 births
Living people
People from Randaberg
Norwegian speedway riders
Polish speedway riders
Sportspeople from Stavanger
Speedway World Cup champions
Polish speedway champions
Naturalized citizens of Poland
Norwegian emigrants to Poland